Neslihan Yakupoğlu (born September 26, 1990) is a Turkish women's handballer, who plays in the Turkish Women's Handball Super League for Ardeşen GSK, and the Turkey national team. The -tall sportswoman plays in the line player position.

She played for Kastamonu Türk Telekom (2009–2010) and Maliye Milli Piyango SK (2010–2012) before she joined Ardeşen GSK in 2013.

References 

1990 births
Sportspeople from Kastamonu
Turkish female handball players
Ardeşen GSK players
Turkey women's national handball players
Living people
21st-century Turkish women